Thomas S. Weeks (December 16, 1833 – February 5, 1910) was an American politician and gunsmith.

Weeks was a member of the Wisconsin State Assembly in 1874 as a Democrat. Weeks was born on December 16, 1833, in Monroe, New York. He settled in Fond du Lac, Wisconsin in 1850 and was a gunsmith, and also ran a gun shop.

He died in Fond du Lac on February 5, 1910.

References

People from Monroe, New York
Politicians from Fond du Lac, Wisconsin
Democratic Party members of the Wisconsin State Assembly
1833 births
1910 deaths